Harald Franz Schmidt (born 18 August 1957) is a German actor, comedian, television presenter and writer best known as the host of two popular German late-night shows.

Early and private life 
A son of refugees who fled from Sudetenland (now Czech Republic) in 1945, Schmidt spent his youth in Swabian Nürtingen. Due to his strict Catholic upbringing he devoted time to the Roman Catholic church, serving as choirmaster and playing the organ.

At the age of 21, Schmidt went to Stuttgart to attend drama school for three years. After that, he gained on-stage experience at Städtische Bühne (Municipal Stage) in Augsburg. His first role was that of the 2nd Mamaluke in Lessing's Nathan the Wise. In 1984, Schmidt became a lyricist for the cabaret Kom(m)ödchen in Düsseldorf and in 1986, was honoured as "Best Newcomer cabaret artist" and toured through Germany with his own show.

In October 2005, his daughter Amelie was born. Schmidt resides in Cologne with his partner Ellen Hantsch, a school teacher, and their five children, the eldest being from a previous relationship. Little is known about the children and their two mothers as Schmidt shields them from the public. In interviews he hardly talks about them.

Television career 
Before long, TV noticed the talented young comedian, and in 1988, Schmidt began to host his first TV show, MAZ ab. This was followed by shows like Psst! and Schmidteinander. The biggest boost to his career occurred in 1992, when Schmidt started hosting the popular Saturday night show Verstehen Sie Spaß? (a variation of Candid Camera). Schmidt was awarded Germany's most important TV award, the Adolf-Grimme-Preis, which would be followed by many others. Just one year later, he was honoured as the "Entertainer of the Year" and awarded the Bambi Award, as well as the Golden Camera.

In 2004, Schmidt toured through Germany with a live comedy show, featuring his former late night show sidekick Manuel Andrack.

Harald Schmidt Show
In 1995, Schmidt changed from the publicly funded TV station ARD to the privately owned German television network Sat.1 in order to host a late night show similar to Late Night with Conan O'Brien and Late Show with David Letterman. The show, named Die Harald Schmidt Show, featured stand-up comedy as well as famous national and international guests. From 30 June 2003, the show was broadcast five days a week, including Monday evening. On 8 December 2003, Schmidt suddenly announced the end of the show, following a change of management of Sat.1. The last show was aired on 23 December 2003. The following suspension of the TV format lasted until 2011, when the show returned to Sat.1.

Harald Schmidt

In 2004, Schmidt began a second run with a new show named Harald Schmidt on publicly funded ARD, where he had begun his television career 16 years earlier. The show no longer featured "celebrity" interviews but dealt even more with the discussion of current events in a rather freely associative manner. Manuel Andrack returned as his sidekick.

On his first show after the break, Schmidt appeared with long hair and a full beard, making fun of his long absence from the public. After summer break in 2005 the "celebrity guest" segment was reintroduced.

Schmidt & Pocher

Late in 2007, Manuel Andrack was replaced by comedian Oliver Pocher, who had a more active part than his predecessor, and some other elements changed as well. The broadcast's title was changed to Schmidt & Pocher, trying to attract a younger audience. Pocher appeared "less intellectual", a fact that caused some criticism among Schmidt's core audience and broadsheet newspaper comments in Germany.

Harald Schmidt
After the termination of Schmidt & Pocher, Schmidt again hosted the show under its former title Harald Schmidt, this time without any sidekick.

Relaunch of the Harald Schmidt Show

On 15 September 2011, Schmidt returned to his former network Sat.1, picking up its former name of Die Harald Schmidt Show again. However, Sat.1 cancelled the show after one season due to low ratings. Starting 4 September 2012, new episodes were shown on Sky Hits HD and Sky Atlantic HD, two channels of the German Pay-TV network Sky Deutschland. Schmidt hosted his very last show on 13 March 2014. He announced he would not return to TV. SKY published the last show on video-sharing website YouTube.

Concept and personalities 

The self-proclaimed hypochondriac became popular for his cynical jokes, cruel remarks and wry intellectual wit. (Even though he is obsessed with health he was able to lampoon this weak spot in a self ironic TV commercial for a medicine curing colds.) Schmidt models himself after people like Johnny Carson and Conan O'Brien, but adds factors and qualities to his show himself.

He engaged in long, seemingly boring conversations with his "supervising producer" Manuel Andrack (known as "chief dramatic adviser"), who sat at a desk next to Schmidt's until 2005, and, like David Letterman, also included his staff in the show, for instance, his cue card girl Suzana Novinscak and his band leader Helmut Zerlett. Schmidt celebrated the return of French woman Nathalie Licard in his ARD era (like Zerlett she is still part of Schmidt's team). In Schmidt's original Harald Schmidt Show (1995–2003), Licard was involved in the goings-on in front of the audience too.

Criticism 
Especially during the first years of Die Harald Schmidt Show, Schmidt was sometimes criticised for making fun of minorities like foreigners or gays. He also did Adolf Hitler imitations in his show (in one of these he as Hitler warned young people not to vote for racist and nationalistic parties). Schmidt's more unorthodox and politically incorrect jokes have garnered the show a reputation as cult television and his supporters accused critics of being incapable of understanding satire.

In the later years of its first run on Sat.1 (circa 2001–2003), the Harald Schmidt Show became a critics' favourite due to Schmidt's "intellectual" sense of humour, especially for incorporating many references to high culture (be it literature, theater, classical music, painting, or cinema), history, and philosophy. Another recurring item were forays into surrealism and absurdity that were pretty much anathema to commercial or "mainstream" interest: For example, Schmidt hosted one show completely in French (re-broadcast a few days later on Franco-German channel Arte, this Show en Francais episode gained glowing reviews from French critics). On another occasion, the screen was blacked for half of the show making it into a "radio broadcast". Another time, Schmidt disproved a critic who had written that it is impossible to spend several minutes on TV just cracking nuts without anybody saying anything. The show's reviews and renown among critics gradually worsened during the years of its ARD run (2004–2010), especially because Schmidt's choice of Oliver Pocher as a new sidekick was considered a mistake that diminished the entire show's quality.

Other activities 

Schmidt's first book, Tränen im Aquarium, was published in 1993, the second, Mulatten in gelben Sesseln, in 2005.

1994–2013 H. Schmidt worked as a columnist for one of the major German weekly news magazines, Focus. Many of his articles were assembled and released as books. The first of these, Warum? ("Why?"), was published in 1997; another nine books followed.

Schmidt also voiced an audiobook, Jerry Cotton – Mein erster Fall beim FBI (2003).

Awards 

Schmidt has won more than 30 television, comedy and theatrical awards, including three German Television Awards, the viewers choice award Bambi, the Grimme Award, the Golden Camera and the RTL Golden Lion as best talk show host. In 2013, he became a Cavalier of Ordre national de la Légion d'honneur.

Work

Filmography 
Film

Television

Discography 
 1997: Die Besten Sprüche aus der Harald Schmidt Show
 1998: Die besten Harald Schmidt Sprüche, Vol. 2
 2004: Schmidtgift
 2005: LiveMitSchmidt

Videography 
 2000: Harald Schmidt – Respektlos und rezeptfrei
 2004: Die Harald Schmidt – The Best of Vol. 1 & 2 + Golden Goals
 2005: Harald Schmidt – Best of Harald Schmidt 2005
 2006: Harald Schmidt – Best of Harald Schmidt 2006
 2007: Harald Schmidt – Gala
 2008: Harald Schmidt & Oliver Pocher – Das erste Jahr: Best of
 2011: Ich hab schon wieder überzogen / Überstehen ist alles
 2011: Die Harald Schmidt Show – Die ersten 100 Jahre: 1995–2003
 2013: Die Harald Schmidt Show – Die zweiten 100 Jahre: 1995–2003

Bibliography 

 1993: Tränen im Aquarium. Ein Kurzausflug ans Ende des Verstandes, .
 1997: Warum? Neueste Notizen aus dem beschädigten Leben, .
 1999: Wohin? Allerneueste Notizen aus dem beschädigten Leben, .
 2002: Quadrupelfuge. Variationen über 4 Themen auf 240 Seiten'', .
 2002: Warum und wohin? Gesammelte Notizen aus dem beschädigten Leben, .
 2004: Avenue Montaigne. Roman, très nouveau, .
 2004: Warum und wohin?, .
 2005: Mulatten in gelben Sesseln. Die Tagebücher 1945 – 52 und die Focus-Kolumnen, .
 2006: Avenue Montaigne & Quadrupelfuge, .
 2007: Sex ist dem Jakobsweg sein Genitiv. Eine Vermessung, .
 2009: Ich hatte 3000 Frauen. Deutschlands größter TV-Star packt aus, .
 2011: Fleischlos schwanger mit Pilates. Erfolgreiche Frauen sagen, wie es geht, .

Literature 

 2003: Kay Sokolowsky: Late Night Solo – Die Methode Harald Schmidt. Aufbau-Taschenbuch-Verlag, Berlin, .
 2004: Mariam Lau: Harald Schmidt – Eine Biografie. Ullstein Verlag, Berlin, .
 2006: Peter Reinwarth: Wer ist Harald Schmidt. Edition Steffan, Köln, .
 2009: Julia Wenmakers: Rechtliche Grenzen der neuen Formen von Satire im Fernsehen. Wo hört bei Stefan Raab und Harald Schmidt der Spaß auf? Verlag Dr. Kovac, Hamburg, .

References

External links 

Die Harald Schmidt Show on YouTube.com

1957 births
Living people
People from Neu-Ulm
People from Nürtingen
German Roman Catholics
Chevaliers of the Légion d'honneur
German male comedians
German television talk show hosts
German television personalities
Hypochondriacs
ARD (broadcaster) people
Sat.1 people
Westdeutscher Rundfunk people